Carl Johann Otto Busse (22 September 1834, Berlin – 3 December 1896, Berlin) was a German architect and master builder. He was born as the son of architect Carl Ferdinand Busse (1802–1868). He married in 1865.

His work includes the 1880s extension of the Schloss Britz in Berlin.

References

External links 
  Carl Johann Otto Busse

1834 births
1896 deaths
19th-century German architects
Architects from Berlin